Oya (Idie Okonkwo) is a fictional superheroine appearing in American comic books published by Marvel Comics. The character first appeared in The Uncanny X-Men #528, in the third chapter of the "Five Lights" storyline, and was created by Matt Fraction and Kieron Gillen. She is one of the "Five Lights"—a group of mutants who manifested their abilities after the events of "Second Coming".

Publication history
Oya first appeared in Uncanny X-Men as newly manifested mutant who is deeply conflicted about her powers.   Following her introduction, she, along with Hope Summers, Velocidad, Transonic, Zero, and Primal, began to feature in the series Generation Hope.  She made appearances in Uncanny X-Men, Wolverine and the X-Men, All-New X-Men, and is currently featured in Sabretooth & The Exiles.

Fictional character biography

The Third Light
Idie is a fourteen-year-old girl from Delta State, Nigeria when her powers manifest. The first manifestation of her powers causes her village to burn down, and when she starts to freeze things as well, she is considered by the locals to be a witch. By the time Storm and Hope arrive, Idie's family and friends have been killed.  Hope stabilizes Idie's powers, and Idie uses her new abilities to drive away the paramilitary group that was attempting to kill her.

From her introduction, Idie is shown to have deep religious reservations with respect to her status as a mutant.  She has viewed herself as a "monster" and has wished her mutation was as obvious as Laurie's, so that her "sin" would be just as obvious. When deciding not to be called "The Girl Who Wouldn't Burn," Idie describes herself as "a witch child," "a blasphemy," and "a heretic." She states that if she cannot burn in this world, she will burn in the next. She later tells Wolverine that she has made peace with the fact that she is a monster.

Schism
As he returns from an obviously tiring mission, Wolverine encounters Hope and the Lights, including Oya, awaiting his return so they can start Combat Training class. Wolverine cancels the class he had no knowledge of, and instead asks them if they should not be doing something more age appropriate; specifically, he asks Oya if she had a doll or something to go play with. Oya states that she had a doll, but it was destroyed when her village people came to kill her. Later, Wolverine solicits Shadowcat to retrieve a new doll for Oya, which he gives while they share some ice cream.

Oya is one of the X-Men to attend the opening of a Mutant History Museum, a group that includes several adult and younger mutants. When the Museum is attacked by the new Hellfire Club, most of the X-Men are quickly defeated as Oya hides. Both Wolverine and Cyclops rush towards the museum, but the Hellfire grunts begin setting up a bomb within the museum. To Wolverine's protest, Cyclops gives Oya the go ahead to do anything she thinks necessary, and Oya "murders" most of the Hellfire grunts. Outside the museum, she is comforted by Hope and the other Lights, but Oya simply wants to return to Utopia to get some sleep.

Oya doesn't have any remorse for killing the Hellfire grunts. She tells Wolverine, that once you accept being a monster, being a murderer isn't so bad. Laurie is furious at Hope for letting her be part of the Sentinel battle on Utopia. She went as far as to point a gun at Hope. Hope realizes that she didn't do a good job taking care of her. She tells Wolverine to take Oya with her to the new school which will be The Jean Grey Academy, and take better care of her than she could. Oya and Hope share a heart-felt good bye. When Wolverine and his new crew of teachers and students land in Westchester, Oya asks Wolverine if she is responsible for breaking up the X-Men, Wolverine replies: "No, darlin'. You led us home."

Regenesis
Oya is no longer part of Generation Hope and she is now part of the Wolverine and the X-Men. During a visit from Deathlok to the Jean Grey School of Higher Learning, it is suggested that Idie has a high probability of eventually becoming leader of the X-Men. Later on she left the school and joined the Hellfire Academy for the sole purpose of finding out who shot Broo. Idie caught the eye of Kade Kilgore who wanted to make Idie the new Black Queen of the Hellfire Club and his girlfriend. While changing into her new Black Queen outfit, Idie questioned him about Broo and he revealed he shot him. After a fight she escaped alongside Quentin Quire and Toad.

Residing on Krakoa
Idie was one of many mutants who moved to Krakoa when it became an independent nation, and was one of the former Xavier Institute students living at the Akademos Habitat.

She became involved with Nekra and when the two killed a bunch of mercenaries who were invading the island by sea, they were sentenced to the Pit of Exile for breaking the "murder no man" law. Arriving in the pit's simulated reality they were greeted by its original resident Sabretooth. At first he tried to hunt them down, but after Third-Eye used his powers to break the illusion he convinced Victor that they weren't the ones he wanted to hurt, so he changed the illusion to make them all prison cellmates with Professor X and Magneto as the wardens. Victor began working on a plan for them to escape the pit by channeling their consciousnesses through the island so they could manifest themselves on land. He sent everyone up the surface on missions to gather allies to help in their quest, a distrustful Nekra and Oya decided to ignore his request and instead seek out their own ally, Bling!. When a fight between Sabretooth and Melter almost kills everyone in the pit, Nekra and Oya are saved when Third-Eye drags their consciousnesses to the astral plane while Krakoa fixes their bodies. They find themselves in a recreation of Sabretooth's childhood home with him there waiting for them, after having dinner together they all discussed what they did to get thrown in the pit and whether they deserved to be there. Shortly afterwards they met with Cypher who informed them that Sabretooth had betrayed them and escaped The Pit on his own. He offered them their own releases on two conditions, that they take fellow prisoners Nanny and Orphan-Maker and Toad, who had been hiding back in Sabretooth's Hell where they'd originally entered from and that the assembled team hunts down Sabretooth so he can be punished for his crimes. The team of exiles then sails of on a boat made by Madison Jeffries with Nekra assuring her they will never return to Krakoa.

The team tracked Sabretooth to Noble Island, which she and Nekra were horrified to discover was a dumping ground for the bodies of mutants experimented on by Orchis. After fighting a super-powered Orchis agent named “The Creation” and losing Orphan-Maker, Sabretooth came on a boat and smugly offered them a ride. Forming an uneasy alliance with Creed the team infiltrated Orchis Station Two where Orphan-Maker was being held prisoner, alongside hundreds of other Mutants. While trying to free a bunch of them from cages, Dr. Barrington's Creation burst through the wall. Fleeing from Orphan-Maker who Barrington had manipulated into taking his helmet off and was seemingly killed immediately after looking at him. Peter came out and apologised to Nanny for breaking his promise to never take off any piece of his armour, but with his X-Gene now activated they only had a brief amount of time until they were all killed, so to buy more time, Third-Eye took them all to the Astral Plane. When they got there they found Station Three, built inside one of the Astral Plane creatures. While Nanny and Jeffries dealt with Orphan-Maker, Oya explores the base alongside Sabretooth and Toad. She discovers a strange figure trapped inside a pod, Creed and Toad abandon her assuming the figure is hostile but Oya believes she can reason with it and on closer inspection realises the creature is a second, malnourished Sabretooth.

Powers and abilities
Idie has the mutant power of temperature manipulation (an aspect of atmokinesis, like Storm/Ororo). This power allows her to move heat from one area to another, producing various effects, as well as rendering her body completely immune to temperature extremes. To date, Idie's use of her powers has only been limited by the amount of heat available to her within her immediate environment. She is consistently able to move enough heat to create fire in one area and ice in another. While she often creates fire as she creates ice, and vice versa, this is not a necessity. Idie can create ice (Negative Heat) by absorbing heat into herself without releasing it as fire. Idie can then store the heat she has absorbed into herself as a resource for a later time. At will, Idie can release the stored heat in her body as fire (Positive Heat), without requiring to simultaneously create ice. When using her powers, her right eye glows blue, and her left glows orange.

References

African-American superheroes
Comics characters introduced in 2010
Fictional characters with fire or heat abilities
Fictional characters with ice or cold abilities
Fictional Nigerian people
Marvel Comics female superheroes
Marvel Comics mutants